Paul Vergès (5 March 1925 – 11/12 November 2016) was a Réunionese politician. Born in Ubon Ratchathani, Siam to a French diplomat father and Vietnamese mother. Vergès founded the Communist Party of Réunion in 1960, a party which he led until he retired in 1994. He made a political comeback at the 2005 European Parliament elections, when he was elected as the third candidate on the list of the French Communist Party, part of the European United Left–Nordic Green Left group.  Vergès sat in the European Parliament's Committee on Development.

Vergès killed the political opponent of his father, Alexis de Villeneuve, on 25 May 1946. He was condemned for the crime to a sentence of 5 years in prison.

Vergès was an MP in the National Assembly of France from 1957 to 1959, from 1987 to 1988 and from 1994 to 1997. He was a Senator in the French Parliament from 1997 to 2005 and again since 2012. From 1980 to 1990 and from 2005 to 2008, he was a member of the European Parliament. He was president of the regional council of Réunion from 1999 to 2011, regional councillor since 2011, mayor of Le Port from 1972 to 1990 and general councillor of La Réunion from 1956 to 1968 and again from 1986 to 1999.

In the European Parliament, he was also a member of the Subcommittee on Human Rights, a substitute for the Committee on Regional Development, vice-chair of the ACP-EU Joint Parliamentary Assembly and a substitute for the delegation for relations with the countries of Central America.

Vergès died the night of 11/12 November 2016, at the age of 91. His twin brother was the lawyer Jacques Vergès.

References

External links

 European Parliament biography
 Declaration of financial interests (in French; PDF file)

1925 births
2016 deaths
Paul Verges
French people of Vietnamese descent
French Communist Party politicians
Communist Party of Réunion politicians
Deputies of the 3rd National Assembly of the French Fourth Republic
Deputies of the 8th National Assembly of the French Fifth Republic
Deputies of the 10th National Assembly of the French Fifth Republic
French Senators of the Fifth Republic
Senators of Réunion
Presidents of the Regional Council of Réunion
Members of the Regional Council of Réunion
Communist Party of Réunion MEPs
French Communist Party MEPs
Mayors of places in Réunion
MEPs for the Overseas Territories of France 2004–2009
French twins
Paul Verges
Members of Parliament for Réunion